The 2007 FIBA Stanković Continental Champions' Cup, or 2007 FIBA Mini World Cup, was the third edition of the FIBA Stanković Continental Champions' Cup tournament of basketball. It was held in Guangzhou and Macau from July 28 to August 2.

Participating teams 
  Angola (FIBA Africa Champion)
  China (FIBA Asia Champions)
  New Zealand (FIBA Oceania Championship representative)
  Slovenia (FIBA Europe EuroBasket 2005 representative)
  USA (2005 FIBA Americas Championship representative) (represented by the NBA D-League Ambassadors)
  Venezuela (2005 FIBA Americas Championship representative)

Teams played a round-robin tournament.

Results 
28 Jul –  Angola –  New Zealand 67:55

28 Jul –  China –  Venezuela 64:62

28 Jul –  Slovenia –  USA 94:86

29 Jul –  Angola –  Venezuela 94:54

29 Jul –  Slovenia –  China 80:76

29 Jul –  USA –  New Zealand 87:84

31 Jul –  Angola –  China 68:63

31 Jul –  New Zealand –  Slovenia 74:72

31 Jul –  USA –  Venezuela 89:80

1 Aug –  China –  New Zealand 93:63

1 Aug –  Slovenia –  Venezuela 88:68

1 Aug –  USA –  Angola 85:72

2 Aug –  China –  USA 82:67

2 Aug –  New Zealand –  Venezuela 76:73

2 Aug –  Slovenia –  Angola 78:51

Final standings
  Slovenia (4-1)
  China (3-2)
  USA (3-2)
4th  Angola (3-2)
5th  New Zealand (2-3)
6th  Venezuela (0-5)

External links 
 Tournament official website

2007
2007–08 in Chinese basketball
2007–08 in Angolan basketball
2007–08 in Slovenian basketball
2007–08 in American basketball
2007 in New Zealand basketball
2007 in Venezuelan sport
Basketball in Macau